Ebrahim Zalzadeh (c. 1948 – February 22, 1997) was a dissident Iranian author and editor who was murdered in 1997 in what is thought to have been one of the "chain murders" of dissidents by "rogue elements" in Iran's intelligence ministry.

Background
Zalzadeh was editor of the Iranian literary monthly Mayar (also spelled Me'yer), a publication that frequently criticized Iranian government censorship practices against the media, and was forced to close by the authorities in 1995. Zalzadeh oversaw the publishing companies of Bamdad ("Dawn") and Ebtekar ("Initiative").

"Dictatorship will not continue," Ebrahim Zalzadeh wrote in his final editorial to the supreme leader of the Iranian regime, Ayatollah Akbar Hashemi Rafsanjani and he is remembered for that.

Iran's formidable intelligence agencies banned Me'yar after the critical editorial and later kidnapped and executed Ebrahim Zalzadeh. Zalzadeh disappeared on February 22, 1997, and was identified in a Tehran morgue on March 29. According to the coroner's report, his body was discovered half-buried and with multiple stab wounds in the chest, on or about February 24 by a road in the outskirts of Tehran. He was in a Tehran morgue on March 29, 35 days after he had been reported missing.

"Zalzadeh was one of several Iranian writers and publishers who had volunteered to share the punishment of magazine editor Abbas Maroufi, who was sentenced in January 1996 to six months in prison and 35 lashes for criticizing the government."

See also
List of solved missing person cases
List of unsolved murders

Sources
 Freedom Forum Jourists Memorial EBRAHIM ZALZADEH 
 CJP Journalists Killed in 1997: Ebrahim Zalzadeh, Mayar, February 22, 1997, Tehran

References

External links
 Ebrahim Zalzadeh's death report at Amnesty International
 Ebrahim Zalzadeh at International Press Institute

1990s missing person cases
1997 deaths
Assassinated editors
Burials at artist's block of Behesht-e Zahra
Deaths by stabbing
Formerly missing people
Iranian editors
Iranian murder victims
Iranian writers
Male murder victims
Missing person cases in Iran
People murdered in Iran
Persian-language writers
Unsolved murders in Iran
Year of birth uncertain